is a Japanese manga series written by Hiroki Tomisawa and illustrated by Kentaro Hidano. It was serialized in Shueisha's Weekly Shōnen Jump from May to October 2022, with its chapters collected into three tankōbon volumes.

Publication
Written by Hiroki Tomisawa and illustrated by Kentaro Hidano, the series was serialized in Weekly Shōnen Jump from May 9 to October 17, 2022. The chapters have been collected into three tankōbon volumes, published from September 2022 to January 2023.

Viz Media and Manga Plus are publishing chapters of the series in English simultaneously with the Japanese release.

Volume list

Reception
Steven Blackburn from Screen Rant offered praise for the setup of the first chapter, though he was also concerned that the series may not be able to live up to it.

The series was nominated for the 2022 Next Manga Award in the print manga category.

References

External links
  
 
 

Mystery anime and manga
Shōnen manga
Shueisha manga
Suspense anime and manga
Viz Media manga